CFZ may refer to:

Ca' Foscari University of Venice's cultural flow zone
Centro de Futebol Zico Sociedade Esportiva
Centro de Futebol Zico de Brasília Sociedade Esportiva
Chabahar Free Zone, IRAN
ExxonMobil's Controlled Freeze Zone technology